The National Socialist Teachers League (German: , NSLB), was established on 21 April 1929. Its original name was the Organization of National Socialist Educators. Its founder and first leader was former schoolteacher Hans Schemm, the Gauleiter of Bayreuth. The organization was based in Bayreuth at the House of German Education. On October 27, 1938, the NSLB opened its own Realschule for teacher training in Bayreuth.

After Schemm's death in 1935, the new leader, or Reichswalter, was Fritz Wächtler.

This organization saw itself as "the common effort of all persons who saw themselves as teachers or wanted to be seen as educators, independently from background or education and from the type of educational institution". Its goal was to make the Nazi worldview and foundation of all education and especially of schooling. In order to achieve this it sought to have an effect on the political viewpoint of educators, insisting on the further development of their spirit along Nazi lines. Organized mountain excursions in places called  (Exchange Camps of the Reich) were perceived as helping in this purpose.

The organization was dissolved in 1943 by the financial administration of the NSDAP.

See also
J. Hans D. Jensen
Otto Friedrich Ranke

References

External links 

Nationalsozialistischer Lehrerbund (NSLB) in: „Historisches Lexikon Bayerns“ (Verf.: Fritz Schäffer)
einestages: Nazi-Erzieher mit Eispickel

Education trade unions
Bayreuth
1929 establishments in Germany
1943 disestablishments in Germany
Nazi Party organizations
Trade unions established in 1929
Organizations disestablished in 1943
Education in Nazi Germany
Fascist trade unions